The 2006 Scottish League Cup final was a football match played on 19 March 2006 at Hampden Park in Glasgow. It was the final match of the 2005–06 Scottish League Cup and the 59th Scottish League Cup final. The final was contested by Dunfermline Athletic and Celtic. Celtic won the match 3–0, thanks to goals from Maciej Zurawski, Shaun Maloney and Dion Dublin.

The Celtic team all wore the number 7 on their shorts in honour of former player Jimmy Johnstone, who had died a week earlier.

Match details

Road to the final

References

2006
Scottish League Cup Final 2006
Scottish League Cup Final 2006
League Cup Final
2000s in Glasgow